Media Group (formerly known as Media Indonesia Group) is an Indonesian media group founded by businessman and politician Surya Paloh. The group owns two newspapers (the national Media Indonesia and the regional Lampung Post), three television networks (Metro TV, BN Channel and Magna Channel), and a radio station MG Radio Network.

Business units

Print media 
 PT Citra Media Nusa Purnama (Media Indonesia)
 PT Masa Kini Mandiri (Lampung Post)
 PT Media Nasional Restorasi (Prioritas)

Printing 
 Media Indonesia Publishing
 Lampost Publishing

Broadcasting 
 PT Media Televisi Indonesia (Metro TV)
 PT Mitra Siaran Digital (BN Channel, Metro Globe Network)
 PT Mitra Media Digital (Magna Channel)
 PT Radio Agustina Junior (MG Radio Network)
 PT Radio Suara Alam Indah (SAI Radio)

Online 
 PT Citra Multimedia Indonesia (Medcom.id)
 Dadali.id
 Clicks.id
 Apakareba.id
 RuangJurnalistik.id
 Gaya.id
 Oase.id
 Autogear.id
 PT Inibaru Media (Inibaru.id)
 MediaIndonesia.com
 MetroTVNews.com
 PT Citra Multimedia Indonesia Lampung (Lampost.co)
 Podme.id
 PT Media Nuwo Kreatif Nusantara (Toko108.com)
 PT Indonesia Idea Media (iD.M)

Event organizer 
 Lampost Event Organizer

Property 
 PT Citragraha Nugratama (The Papandayan)
 PT Grahasahari Suryajaya (The Media Hotel & Towers)
 Intercontinental Bali Resort
 Gedung Media Group
 PT China Sonangol Media Investment (Indonesia-1 Tower)
 Masjid Nursiah Daud Paloh
 Media Academy
 Lampung Post Education Center

Catering and restaurant 
 PT Indocater
 PT Pangansari Utama Food Resources (Pangansari)
 PT Pangansari Utama (PSU)
 PT Dunia Daging Food Industries (DDFI)
 PT Pangansari Utama Food Industri (PUFI)
 PT Pangansari Utama Food Distribution (PUFD)
 PT Pangansari Utama Patisserie (Pupat)
 PT Plasma Usaha Mitra Selaras (PUMS)
 PT Daya Prima Lestari (DPL)
 PT Niaga Buana Solusi Utama (NBSU)
 PT Indomaint Karya Utama (IMKU)

Natural resources 
 PT Pusaka Marmer Indahraya (Pumarin)
 PT Indoenergi Platinum
 PT Surya Energi Raya
 PT Emas Mineral Murni (EMM)
 PT Media Djaya Bersama

Former assets 
 PT Media Kalimantan Mandiri (Borneonews) (now owned by Citra Borneo Indah)
 PT Televisi Mandiri Papua (Papua TV) (previously known by name Metro Papua TV and TVMP)
 PT Sunu Network Broadcast Televisi (Celebes TV) (now owned by Bosowa Corporation)
 MetroXtend (closed in 2020)
 Jelajah (closed in 2019)

References

External links 
 

 
Companies based in Jakarta
Indonesian companies established in 1984
Mass media companies established in 1984
Mass media companies of Indonesia
Privately held companies of Indonesia